The 731st Expeditionary Attack Squadron (731st EATKS) is a unit of the United States Air Force. It was activated on 4 March 2021 at the Romanian Air Force 71st Air Base in Câmpia Turzii. The unit is part of the 31st Operations Group and operates MQ-9 Reaper unmanned aerial vehicles.

As the 731st Bombardment Squadron, it was last active during the Korean War, assigned to the 452d Bombardment Group but attached to the 3d Bombardment Group at Iwakuni Air Base, Japan, where it was inactivated on 25 June 1951.

The squadron was first activated in 1943.  After training in the United States with the Boeing B-17 Flying Fortress, the squadron deployed to the European Theater of Operations, participating in the strategic bombing campaign against Germany.  It earned a Distinguished Unit Citation (DUC) during an attack on a German jet fighter base near Kaltenkirchen in April 1945.  Following V-E Day, the squadron returned to the United States and was inactivated.

The squadron was activated again in the reserves in 1947.  Two years later, it began to train with Douglas B-26 Invaders.  In August 1950, the squadron was one of the first reserve units mobilized for the Korean War.  After filling its ranks and undergoing intensive training, the squadron deployed to Far East Air Forces and began flying combat missions.  It was awarded two additional DUCs for its operations in Korea.  In June 1951, the squadron was inactivated and its personnel and equipment were transferred to a regular unit that was simultaneously activated.

History

World War II

The squadron was first activated in June 1943 at Geiger Field, Washington as one of the four original squadrons of the 452d Bombardment Group. Later that month, it moved to Rapid City Army Air Base, South Dakota and began to train with the Boeing B-17 Flying Fortress. It continued training with Second Air Force until December, when it began its movement to the European Theater of Operations. The air echelon deployed via the South Atlantic air ferry route.

The squadron established itself at RAF Deopham Green in January 1944, and began operations on 4 February 1944 with a strike on an aircraft assembly plant near Brunswick.  Its strategic targets included railroad marshalling yards near Frankfurt, aircraft factories near Regensberg and Kassel. the ball bearing factory at Schweinfurt and an oil refinery near Bohlen. In September 1944, the squadron participated in the third shuttle mission, striking Chemnitz before landing in bases in the Soviet Union.

The 731st was occasionally diverted to support tactical operations.  It hit airfields, V-weapon launching sites, bridges and other objectives in preparations for Operation Overlord, the invasion of Normandy.  It bombed enemy positions to support Operation Cobra, the breakout at Saint Lo, in July 1944 and the attacks on Brest, France in August.  It supported Operation Market Garden, airborne attacks attempting to establish a bridgehead across the Rhine in the Netherlands, in September and, during the Battle of the Bulge, struck German lines of communication.  It struck an airfield to support Operation Varsity, the airborne assault across the Rhine in Germany.

Shortly before the end of the war, on 7 April, the squadron struck the jet fighter base at Kaltenkirchen, pressing the attack despite strong fighter opposition, earning a Distinguished Unit Citation.  It flew its last mission of the war on 21 April against marshalling yards at Ingolstadt.

After V-E Day, in August 1945, the squadron returned to the United States (the ground echelon once again sailed on the RMS Queen Elizabeth) and was inactivated at Sioux Falls Army Air Field, South Dakota.

Reserve duty and Korean War call-up

The squadron was reactivated in the reserve at Long Beach Army Air Field, California in 1947 as a very heavy bomber squadron, but conducted proficiency flying with a variety of trainer airplanes under the supervision of the 416th AAF Base Unit (later the 2347th Air Force Reserve Training Center). In a 1949 reorganization of the reserves, it became a light bomber squadron and began to equip and train with Douglas B-26 Invaders.  The squadron was manned at only 25% of its authorized strength.

The squadron was mobilized for the Korean War in August 1950 in the first wave of reserve mobilizations.  To help bring it up to strength, the squadron was augmented by reservists assigned to the 448th Bombardment Wing, which was also stationed at Long Beach, but remained in reserve status until the following year. The 731st was a squadron of one of the first two reserve wings to be mobilized, and administrative provisions for mobilization proved inadequate, with numerous reservists never receiving the telegrams calling them to active duty.

The unit moved to George Air Force Base, California for intensive training and to be brought up to full strength.  In October, the squadron deployed to Iwakuni Air Base, Japan to begin combat operations. The Air Force decided that, unlike the three other squadrons of the 452d Group, the 731st would be trained for night intruder operations.  Although the squadron remained part of the 452d until inactivated, it was attached to the understrength 3d Bombardment Group upon its arrival in theater. Four of its crews left George in mid-September and participated in combat operations with the 3d Group during October, although the first mission by the squadron was on 24 November.  The 731st flew night bombing missions at all altitudes, using both visual and radar techniques.  Its Invaders also flew close air support and armed reconnaissance flights.  It also flew flare drop missions, operating Douglas C-47 Skytrains.  By June 1951, the 731st had flown more than 9,000 hours of combat and 2,000 combat sorties.

The remaining two squadrons assigned to the 3d Bombardment Group had also been put on night operations.  In June 1951, the 3d was brought up to strength by the activation of the 90th Bombardment Squadron, and the 731st Squadron was inactivated while its personnel and aircraft transferred to the 90th and other elements of the 3d Group.

Reactivation and deployment to Romania

In 2021, the US Air Force deployed MQ-9 Reaper drones and about 90 airmen to Romania, at the 71st Air Base. The unit is part of the 31st Expeditionary Operations Group, Detachment 1 and is subordinate to the 31st Fighter Wing at Aviano Air Base, Italy. Beginning on 1 February, the 25th Attack Group, located at the Shaw Air Force Base, South Carolina and under the command of the 432nd Air Expeditionary Wing began flying active-duty sorties via remote-split operations. The drones fly on Intelligence, surveillance and reconnaissance (ISR), as well as freedom of maneuver missions and integrate with joint and coalition forces in the region. The MQ-9s also participate in exercises that ensure interoperability with allied and partner nations.

On 4 March 2021, the 731st Expeditionary Attack Squadron was activated at the base. The squadron also participated in Operation Porcupine 2021, working together with the 510th Fighter Squadron, 56th and 57th Rescue Squadrons, and the 606th Air Control Squadron. The Reapers can be equipped with AGM-114 Hellfire missiles, two external fuel tanks, and a variety of sensor pods.

On 14 July 2022, one MQ-9 of the squadron crashed in a field south of the base while conducting a routine mission in the region. The accident caused no injuries, or damage to structures.

2023 Black Sea incident

On 14 March 2023, an MQ-9 Reaper took off from a base in Romania on a scheduled reconnaissance mission over the Black Sea. While over international waters, it was intercepted by two Russian Air Force Su-27 fighter jets. One of the Flankers damaged the Reaper drone causing it to crash. The incident took place at 7:03 in the morning.

Lineage
 Constituted as the 731st Bombardment Squadron (Heavy) on 14 May 1943
 Activated on 1 June 1943
 Redesignated 731st Bombardment Squadron, Heavy on 20 August 1943
 Inactivated on 28 August 1945
 Redesignated 731st Bombardment Squadron, Very Heavy on 13 May 1947
 Activated in the reserve on 12 July 1947
 Redesignated 731st Bombardment Squadron, Light on 27 June 1949
 Redesignated 731st Bombardment Squadron, Light, Night Attack on 1 August 1950
 Ordered to active service on 10 August 1950
 Inactivated on 25 June 1951
 Redesignated 731st Expeditionary Attack Squadron on 4 March 2021

Assignments
 452d Bombardment Group, 1 June 1943 – 28 August 1945
 452d Bombardment Group, 12 July 1947 – 25 June 1951 (attached to 3d Bombardment Group after November 1950)
 31st Operations Group, 4 March 2021 – present

Stations
 Geiger Field, Washington, 1 June 1943
 Rapid City Army Air Base, South Dakota, c. 13 June 1943
 Pendleton Field, Oregon, 10 October 1943
 Walla Walla Army Air Base, Washington, c. 4 November–December 1943
 RAF Deopham Green (AAF-142), England, c. 8 January 1944 – 6 August 1945
 Sioux Falls Army Air Field, South Dakota, c. 12–28 August 1945
 Long Beach Army Air Field (later Long Beach Municipal Airport), California, 19 April 1947
 George Air Force Base, California, 10 August–October 1950
 Iwakuni Air Base, Japan, 17 November 1950 – 25 June 1951
 Câmpia Turzii Air Base, Romania, 4 March 2021 – present

Aircraft
 Boeing B-17 Flying Fortress, 1943–1945
 Douglas B-26 Invader, 1950–1951
 Douglas C-47 Skytrain, 1951
 General Atomics MQ-9 Reaper, 2021–present

Awards and campaigns

See also

 B-17 Flying Fortress units of the United States Army Air Forces
 List of A-26 Invader operators
 List of Douglas C-47 Skytrain operators

References
 Notes

 Citations

Bibliography

 
 
 
 
 

 Further reading
 
 

Bombardment squadrons of the United States Air Force
Bombardment squadrons of the United States Army Air Forces
Aircraft squadrons of the United States Air Force in the Korean War
Military units and formations of the United States Air Force Reserves
Military units and formations established in 1943
World War II strategic bombing units
Attack squadrons of the United States Air Force